Richard James Livingstone Altham  (19 January 1924 – 17 August 2005) was an English first-class cricketer who played for  Oxford University Cricket Club and the Free Foresters.
His highest score of 14 came when playing for Oxford University in the match against Free Foresters.  
He also played for Hertfordshire in the Minor Counties Championship. He was educated at Marlborough College and Trinity College, Oxford.

He was appointed MBE in the 2000 New Year Honours for services to young people and to Book Aid.

His father was Harry Altham CBE, the cricket historian, coach and schoolmaster of Winchester College.

References

1924 births
2005 deaths
Cricketers from Winchester
English cricketers
Oxford University cricketers
Hertfordshire cricketers
Free Foresters cricketers
People educated at Marlborough College
Alumni of Trinity College, Oxford
Members of the Order of the British Empire